Enertia may refer to:

 Brammo Enertia
 Brammo Enertia GT